Boonie Bears ("Roaming Bears" ; Bear Hunting) is a Chinese animated cartoon series shown on multiple Chinese platforms and television stations, including Central China Television (CCTV) and Beijing Television Network (BTV). The series features two bears, Briar and Bramble, who try to stop Logger Vick from destroying their forest home. Some other minor characters, mainly animals, are also shown, such as an owl, a gopher, and two monkeys. This cartoon show also shown in India on Big Magic Chanel in Hindi language  as Bablu Aur Dablu.

The franchise is Fantawild Animation's tentpole and "has been the biggest animation brand in China for many years" according to Variety.

Origin 
Boonie Bears was first shown in January 2012 and last shown in February 2022 and became the most popular children's show in China. More than 600 thirteen-minute episodes have been produced so far. The series is produced by Fantawild Holdings Inc.

Creation and translations 
Although originally created in China, Boonie Bears has been translated to other languages, such as English, Spanish, French, Russian, Tamil and Hindi (as Babloo Dabloo on BIG Magic.) It has now been distributed to 82 countries worldwide and partnered with Netflix, Sony, and Disney.

Characters

Victor “Vick”
Vick (Formerly called Logger Vick)() is a logger who often runs into the animals for his misdeeds against the forest. He is bald, usually wearing hat or an equestrian helmet to conceal it. He is often seen carrying a chainsaw or a hunting rifle, wearing a jacket and jeans. Despite his menacing demeanor, Vick is often stays determined in light of threats from the forest, his superiors and poverty, not wishing to be in conflict with anyone if possible, despite sometimes seeking vengeance as a hunter. Vick later becomes a tour guide to preserve the forest with his animal friends. (Voiced by: Toni Thompson Paul "Maxx" Rinehart)

Mr. Li 
Mr. Li is Logger Vick's unseen merciless boss. He is primarily known for threatening Vick and deducting his salary for providing any benefits. (Voiced by: Rick Jay Glen Paul "Maxx" Rinhart)

Briar 
Briar is a Himalayan brown bear Bramble’s older brother  and a valiant, kind and respected figure in the forest. His intelligence and leadership allows him to rally other animals and battle whatever antagonist, be it Vick or not. Whenever the forest is not under threat, Briar has a carefree life with his brother inside their tree-like cave. The color of his fur is reddish-brown he also had a white colored chest similar to an Asian black bear. (Voiced by: Rick Jay Glen, Gene E. Hobbs, Mario Lopez, and Kieran Katarey.)

Bramble 
Bramble is Himalayan brown bear and Briar's younger brother. Bramble is physically robust (more so than his brother though he and his brother were both quite fat) but brash, dim-witted, naive and hedonistic and also sometimes childish, much to Briar's annoyance, although he has proven himself on occasion. He also enjoys food of many kinds, specifically fish and honey. The color of his fur is light yellowish-brown like his brother he also has a white colored chest similar to an Asian black bear. (Voiced by: Justin J Wheeler, Josh Peck, Joseph Lambert)

Warren 
Warren is a nervous squirrel and a friend of the bears. He likes pine cones and nuts. Warren's agility allows him to weave through threats and conduct espionage for the bears. He is allergic to snacks he is also mistaken for a female. (Voiced by: Toni Thompson, Siobhan Lumsden)

Herbert “herb” Diggs 
Herbert Diggs is a gopher who lives in the forest. He is unusually obsessed with radishes, carrots and turnips, attempting to secure them at all ends when given the chance. His expertise in subterranean navigation and excavation gives him the upper hand in many confrontations. His voice is somewhat high-pitched in the Mandarin version.(Voiced by: Toni Thompson, Justin J Wheeler, Joseph S Lambert)

Hoo Hoo 
Hoo Hoo is an owl who lives in the forest. She is very forgetful and lazy, dozing even in her flight. She is only occasionally helpful and refrains to join their conflicts more often than not she also mistaken for a male. (Voiced by: Rick Jay Glen, Siobhan Lumsden)

King Tiki 
Tiki is an arrogant, and greedy monkey. He is the self-proclaimed ruler of the forest that occasionally runs into conflict with other animals and questions Briar's leadership. He and his servant Babu originally came from a jungle along with other monkeys before they were accidentally transported to pine tree mountain forest where they currently live. He really loves fruit, and especially loves bananas. He usually keeps a pineapple crown. He also holds a curved stick in his hands containing a hanging pine cone and wears a necklace made of leaves. (Voiced by: Paul "Maxx" Rinehart)

Babu 
Babu is a small, weak monkey. He is the loyal sidekick and servant of Tiki. (Voiced by: Rick Jay Glen, Gene E. Hobbs)

Fabian 
Fabian is a cat. He became Vick's pet to escape his nomadic life. A fraudulent con artist, he often manipulates Vick and other creatures for private gains. He likes food, particularly fish. Vick officially adopted him in Boonie Bears Forest Frenzy Episode 5. (Voiced by: Toni Thompson, Rick Jay Glen, Siobhan Lumsden)

Sunny 
Sunny is a female fox that is only present for a few episodes. She has a fear of insects and height.(Voiced by: Toni Thompson)

Natasha 
Natasha is a female Himalayan brown bear. She lives in the city and works in a circus. Both Briar and Bramble have a crush on her, although she perceives them friends. She also came to the forest for the bears once.(Voiced by: Toni Thompson)

Louie 
Louie is a crocodile who lives in city along with his friends. He also works in the circus. He often tells stories to his circus friends and the bears. He laughs very loudly, and has also stolen Vick's mother's ornaments.(Voiced by: Justin J Wheeler)

Shao Lin 
Shao Lin is a Siberian tiger who also works in circus and who only appears in Boonie Bears Or Bust. He lives in a cave with his friends in city. He knows martial arts and is often seen practicing. He sometimes saves the bears from Vick.(Voiced by: Rick Jay Glen)

Sheldon 
Sheldon is a small tortoise. He is also a worker in the circus and only appears in Boonie Bears or Bust. He has a big iron ball which he likes a lot, usually wears a cap, and walks much slower that the other characters.(Voiced by: Toni Thompson)

Carly
Carly is a teenage girl from the little town. Sometimes, she takes foolish decisions. She likes the forest and the nature. In the first episode where she appeared in English episodes, she is trying to find her little Kitty, which happens to be a Siberian Tiger. She wants Logger Vick to help her (who was, at this point, a tour guide and thus in league with the creatures) to find her Siberian tiger. This show is based on Carly Leung's life. She was one of the only female characters to have a main role. (Voiced by: Carly Leung)

Maurice 
Maurice (大马猴; Dà mǎ hóu) is a swindler and gangster. He and his partner Arnold have an abundant criminal history, working for many crime lords as henchmen. He is tall and thin, values image, wears a comb all the time. (Voiced by: Toni Thompson, Justin J Wheeler, Joseph S Lambert)

Arnold 
Arnold (二狗; Ér gǒu) is a criminal and sidekick of Maurice, who he aids in their quest. Though muscular, he is often seen more as an annoyance than anything with his violent and reckless tendencies. (Voiced by: Rick Jay Glen)

Theme songs 
 Part 1: I'm a little confused
 Part 2: Universal Adventure
 Part 3: I'm a little confused
 Part 4: My sweetness
 Part 5,6,7: I'm a little confused
 Chinese New Year Movies: I am a little confused (2013)

Episodes

Series 
 Part 1: Boonie Bears (104 episodes)
 Part 2: Boonie Bears: Or Bust (104 episodes)
 Part 3: Boonie Bears: Forest Frenzy (104 episodes)
 Part 4: Boonie Bears: Spring Into Action (50 episodes)
 Part 5: Boonie Bears: Snow Daze (52 episodes)
 Part 6: Boonie Bears: Sunsational Summer (52 episodes)
 Part 7: Boonie Bears: Autumn Awesomeness (50 episodes)
 Part 8: Boonie Bears: The Adventurers (52 episodes)
 Part 9: Boonie Bears: The Adventurers 2 (52 episodes)
 Part 10: Boonie Bears: Monster Plan (52 episodes)
 Part 11: Boonie Bears: Monster Plan 2 (52 episodes)

Other media

Featured films 
Fantawild has produced six feature films in the Boonie Bears brand. The first film based on the series titled Boonie Bears: To the Rescue premiered in China on 17 January 2014. A second film, Boonie Bears: Mystical Winter, was released on 30 January 2015. A third installment, Boonie Bears: The Big Top Secret, was released on 16 January 2016. A fourth film, Boonie Bears: Fantastica, was released on 28 January 2017. A fifth film in the series, Boonie Bears: The Big Shrink, was released on 16 February 2018. The sixth installment, Boonie Bears: Blast Into the Past, premiered in theaters all over China on 5 February 2019. Boonie Bears: Homeward Journey and Boonie Bears: Robo-Rumble are also feature films and stand-alone films, Boonie Bears: The Wild Life, released in China on 12 February 2021. Boonie Bears: Back to Earth was released in China on 1 February 2022 as part of the Chinese New Year slate.

Box office performance

Books 
 The Universal Adventure of the Bears (Jungle): Tracker
 The Universal Adventure of the Bears (Jungle): Gopher Wars
 The Universal Adventure of the Bears (Jungle): Invincible Fire Tongs
 The Universal Adventure of the Bears (Jungle): Become a Warrior
 The Universal Adventure of the Bears (Jungle): Werewolf Night

Awards and nominations

Dubbed versions 
Babloo Dabloo in Big Magic (Hindi)
 Babloo Dabloo in Fakt Marathi (Marathi)
 Varuthapadatha Karadi Sangam in Chutti TV (Tamil)
 Kirik Karadigalu in Chintu TV (Kannada)
 Bear Brothers in Kushi TV (Telugu)
 Aniyan Bava Chettan Bava kattukallanmarodoppam (previously Bamboo Boys) in Kochu TV (Malayalam)
 Boonie Bears in Disney Channel (Mandarin/Taiwan)
 Boonie Bears in Star Chinese Movies (Mandarin/Taiwan)
 Boonie Bears in Star Chinese Channel (Mandarin/Taiwan)
 Boonie Bears in RTV ( Bengali)
 Bablu Dablu in Rongeen TV ( Bengali)
 Jungle Bears on Basma channel (Arabic)
 Boonie Bears on StarTimes Kids (French, Portuguese, Swahili)
 Ayı Kardeşler on Show tv (Turkish)
 Forest protector bears (persian)

See also
 Pleasant Goat and Big Big Wolf, another children's television series in China
 Xingxing Fox, a Chinese cartoon

References

External links

2012 Chinese television series debuts
2010s animated television series
Chinese children's animated adventure television series
Chinese children's animated comedy television series
China Central Television original programming
Computer-animated television series
Animated television series about bears
Animated television series about squirrels
Animated television series about brothers
Mandarin-language television shows
Television shows adapted into films